Ziemenbach is a river of Mecklenburg-Vorpommern, Germany. It is a section of the upper course of river Tollense, a tributary of river Peene. The Ziemenbach discharges into the lake Lieps, which is drained by the Tollense.

See also
List of rivers of Mecklenburg-Vorpommern

Rivers of Mecklenburg-Western Pomerania
Rivers of Germany